Norman Richard Read (13 August 1931 – 22 May 1994) was a New Zealand racewalker. Born in Portsmouth, England, Read emigrated to New Zealand in 1953. The self-proclaimed "Pommie-Kiwi" competed for New Zealand at the 1956 Olympics in the 50 km walk where he won the gold medal. For this achievement he was voted New Zealand’s Sportsman of the Year. Read also took part in the 1960 Summer Olympics in Rome, finishing fifth in the 20 km walk and abandoning the 50 km race. He won a bronze medal in the 20 mile walk at the 1966 British Empire and Commonwealth Games in Kingston, Jamaica, which was his last international tournament.

Read continued competing domestically for another 18 years, retiring at the age 52. He won 18 national titles, placing second thrice and third four times.

On 29 August 1968 Read married Megan Ann Crafar in Whangarei; they had three daughters and a son. After moving to New Plymouth, he founded New Zealand’s first race walking club. At the 1992 Summer Olympics he became only the second New Zealand Olympic judge. He was awarded a diploma by the International Amateur Athletic Federation on its 75th anniversary in 1987, and in 1990 he was elected a foundation member of the New Zealand Sports Hall of Fame. Read was also one of the first three inductees into the Taranaki Sports Hall of Fame at the Taranaki Sports Awards in 2009.

Read died of a heart attack during a veteran's bike race in Pirongia.

References 

1931 births
1994 deaths
Sportspeople from Portsmouth
New Zealand male racewalkers
Olympic gold medalists for New Zealand
Athletes (track and field) at the 1956 Summer Olympics
Athletes (track and field) at the 1960 Summer Olympics
Olympic athletes of New Zealand
Athletes (track and field) at the 1966 British Empire and Commonwealth Games
Commonwealth Games bronze medallists for New Zealand
Commonwealth Games medallists in athletics
English emigrants to New Zealand
Medalists at the 1956 Summer Olympics
Olympic gold medalists in athletics (track and field)
Medallists at the 1966 British Empire and Commonwealth Games